Hans Höfner (born 20 December 1912) was an Austrian cyclist. He competed in the individual and team road race events at the 1936 Summer Olympics.

References

External links
 

1912 births
Year of death missing
Austrian male cyclists
Olympic cyclists of Austria
Cyclists at the 1936 Summer Olympics
Place of birth missing